The Conshohocken Athletic Club was a professional football team based in Conshohocken, Pennsylvania from 1914 until 1920, when the club's financial problems made it impossible to field a team. In the fall of 1921, the newly established Conshohocken Athletic Association took over sponsorship of the team. The new Association was formed as a community-based organization with the purpose of promoting and supporting outdoor athletics and had the full support of Conshohocken Athletic Club.

Conshohocken won the mythical Schuylkill County championship in 1914, 1915 and 1916, before laying claim to the eastern Pennsylvania championship in 1919.

Conshohocken had an annual Thanksgiving rivalry with the Norristown Billikens of Norristown, Pennsylvania; from 1914 to 1916, Conshohocken beat the Billikens in all three games.

Notable players
Earl Potteiger
Bert Yeabsley

Season by season

References
Ghosts of the Gridiron:Conshohocken Athletic Club

American football teams established in 1914
American football teams disestablished in 1925
History of Pennsylvania
Defunct American football teams in Pennsylvania
Early professional American football teams in Pennsylvania
1914 establishments in Pennsylvania
1925 disestablishments in Pennsylvania
Montgomery County, Pennsylvania
 Athletic Club football teams and seasons